George Henry Robinson (11 January 1908 – 15 January 1963) was an English professional footballer who played as an inside forward for Sunderland and Charlton Athletic

References

1908 births
1963 deaths
People from Heanor
Footballers from Derbyshire
English footballers
Association football inside forwards
Ilkeston United F.C. players
Sunderland A.F.C. players
Charlton Athletic F.C. players
Burton Town F.C. players
English Football League players